Victory is a 2008 Indian Telugu-language film directed by Ravi. C. Kumar, released in 2008. The film stars Nithiin, Mamta Mohandas, Shashank, Sindhu Tolani and Ashutosh Rana.

Nithiin plays the role of a vibrant, energetic youngster who is also a very responsible boy. The film throws light on the dreaded Land Mafia. Nithiin fights against them and finally wins. Mohandas, well known for her singing and acting skills, is an added attraction to the film. Tolani and Shashank play supporting roles.

Cast

 Nithiin as Vijay Chandra a.k.a. Vijji
 Mamta Mohandas as Janaki
 Sindhu Tolani as Sindhu
 Shashank as Ravi Kumar
 Ashutosh Rana as MLA K. Devaraj
 Duvvasi Mohan as Satyam
 Brahmanandam as R. Appa Rao
 Satya Prakash as Corrupted IPS Officer
 Tanikella Bharani as Vijji's father
 Ali as The person who tries to corrupt the government officials 
 M. S. Narayana
 Ravi Babu as Laxman Rao
 Ajay as Contract Killer 
 Supreeth Reddy as M. Pandu Ranga
 Krishna Bhagawan as MRO Divadheenam
 Vijaya Rangaraju as Pochaiah
 Nutan Prasad as Judge
 Devadas Kanakala as DGP
 Ranganath as Defence Lawyer
 Jenny as Vijji's uncle

Soundtrack
Music composed by Chakri.

References

External links
 

2000s Telugu-language films
2008 films
Films scored by Chakri